Kugel (pronounced ) is a baked casserole, most commonly made from lokshen or Jewish egg noodles or potato. It is a traditional Ashkenazi Jewish dish, often served on Shabbat and Jewish holidays. American Jews also serve it for Thanksgiving dinner.

Etymology
The name of the dish comes from the Middle High German  meaning 'sphere, globe, ball'; thus the Yiddish name likely originated as a reference to the round, puffed-up shape of the original dishes (compare to German —a type of ring-shaped cake). However, nowadays kugel is often baked in square pans.

Litvaks (Jews from Lithuania, northeastern Poland and northern Russia) call the pudding , Galitzianers (Jews from southeastern Poland and western Ukraine) call it .

History

The first kugels were made from bread and flour and were savory rather than sweet. About 800 years ago, Jewish cooks in Germany replaced bread mixtures with lokshen noodles or farfel. Eventually eggs were incorporated. The addition of cottage cheese and milk created a custard-like consistency common in today's dessert dishes. In Poland, Jewish homemakers added raisins, cinnamon and sweet curd cheese to noodle kugel recipes. In the late 19th century, Jerusalemites combined caramelized sugar and black pepper in a noodle kugel known as the Jerusalem kugel, which is a commonly served at Shabbat kiddushes and is a popular side dish served with cholent during Shabbat lunch.

It is made with or without cheese, but almost always includes raisins. In Transylvania, especially in the Hungarian-speaking regions, a very similar dish is called .

Savory kugel may be based on potatoes, matzah, cabbage, carrots, zucchini, spinach, or cheese.

Romani people call it pirogo. The Romani version is made with raisins, cream cheese, and butter.

Varieties

Jerusalem Kugel

Kugel Yerushalmi, ( kugl yerushalmi in Hebrew), also known as Jerusalem kugel, or Galilean kugel, is an Israeli kugel dish originating from the local Jewish community of Jerusalem in the 1700s.

Noodle kugel

Noodle kugel, also known as lokshen kugel, is an Ashkenazi Jewish casserole, side dish and popular variety of kugel made with lokshen noodles and either a variety of dairy or pareve ingredients.

Potato kugel

Potato kugel is a potato-based kugel of Ashkenazi Jewish origin, made with grated or pureed potatoes, onions, eggs, flour or matzo meal, oil, salt and pepper.

Jewish festivals
Kugels are a mainstay of festive meals in Ashkenazi Jewish homes, particularly on the Jewish Sabbath and other Jewish holidays or at a tish. Some Hasidic Jews believe that eating kugel on the Jewish Sabbath brings special spiritual blessings, particularly if that kugel was served on the table of a Hasidic Rebbe.

While noodle kugel, potato kugel, and other variations are dishes served on Jewish holiday meals, matzo kugel is a common alternative served at Passover seders which is adjusted to meet Passover kosher requirements.

South African slang usage
Among South African Jews, the word kugel was used by the elder generation as a term for a young Jewish woman who forsook traditional Jewish dress values for those of the ostentatiously wealthy and became overly materialistic and overgroomed, mirroring how the kugel is a plain pudding garnished as a delicacy. The women thus described made light of the term, and it has since become an amusing rather than derogatory slang in South African English for a materialistic young woman.

Similar dishes
 Hotdish
 Potatonik
 Zucchini slice

See also

 Cuisine of Israel
 List of casserole dishes

References

External links
 

Ashkenazi Jewish cuisine
Desserts
Jewish cuisine
Israeli cuisine
Pasta dishes
Potato dishes
Yiddish words and phrases
Casserole dishes
Shabbat
Savory puddings
 
Jewish American cuisine
Jewish noodle dishes
Romani cuisine
Romanian cuisine
Thanksgiving food